Christ the King Cathedral at Fiu Village Diocese of Malaita was begun in 1933. It was the victim of an arson attack in 2004.

References
 

Cathedrals in the Solomon Islands